Nandaime is a town and a municipality in the Granada department of Nicaragua.

Nandaime is a small town in the southwestern part of the country. It is located on the Panamerican highway which crosses the Pacific area of Nicaragua, at a distance of 67 km from Managua, capital of the Republic, and 20 kilometers from Granada, the departmental capital. The patron saints are St. Anne and San Joaquin. It was elevated to city on October 29, 1890.

The name Nandaime is derived from the Chorotega word "nanda" (meaning "arroyo", or stream) and the suffix "-ime" (indicating abundance). Nandaime means "place of abundant streams".

References

Municipalities of the Granada Department